Richard Phelps may refer to:

 Richard Phelps (artist) (1710–1785), English portrait artist
 Richard Phelps (bell-founder) (c. 1670–1738), English maker of bells
 Richard Phelps (pentathlete) (born 1961), British Olympic pentathlete
 Richard Phelps (rower) (born 1965), British Olympic rower
 Digger Phelps (Richard F. Phelps, born 1941), American basketball coach
 Richard J. Phelps, American politician

See also
 Phelps (surname)